CJCL (590 AM, Sportsnet 590 The Fan) is a Canadian sports radio station in Toronto, Ontario. Owned and operated by Rogers Sports & Media since 2002, CJCL's studios are located at the Rogers Building at Bloor and Jarvis in downtown Toronto, while its transmitters are located near Grimsby atop the Niagara Escarpment. It is the flagship station for the Toronto Blue Jays, and also airs games from the Toronto Raptors, Toronto Maple Leafs, Buffalo Bisons and Buffalo Bills. CJCL is also a CBS Sports Radio affiliate.

The station began broadcasting on February 21, 1951 as CKFH 1400 owned by Foster Hewitt before moving to 1430 AM in 1960. Telemedia acquired the station in 1981 and relaunched as CJCL. During its early life, the station aired news and sports, Top 40, country music, adult contemporary and talk radio formats. It adopted the current sports format on September 4, 1992 as The Fan 1430 as Canada's first all-sports radio station before swapping frequencies with CKYC 590, acquired in 1994 by Telemedia, on February 6, 1995, adopting The Fan 590 branding. After Telemedia was sold to Standard Broadcasting, Rogers acquired CJCL in 2002.

Due to its location near the bottom of the AM dial, as well as its transmitter power and height, CJCL covers most of southern Ontario during the day. The station's signal is directional from north to south to protect various lower-powered radio stations east and west of the station. CJCL is simulcast across Canada on Bell Satellite TV channel 959, and on Shaw Direct channel 868. It is also carried on the 3rd HD digital subchannel of CKIS-FM.

History
The station first aired on February 21, 1951, as CKFH; operating at 1400 kHz. It was a news and sports station owned by legendary Canadian broadcaster Foster Hewitt (the "FH" of the call sign), who was best known as the first and long-time play-by-play announcer for the Toronto Maple Leafs on what became Hockey Night in Canada. The station moved to the 1430 AM frequency in 1960, increasing power first to 5,000, then 10,000 and finally 50,000 watts. CKFH would begin playing Top 40 music in 1966, then move to a country format in 1975.

 
The station was subsequently sold to Telemedia in 1981 when it adopted its current CJCL call sign and switched to an adult contemporary format. In 1983, the station briefly adopted talk programming, but returned to its music format within a few months, with increased emphasis on oldies. CJCL was the flagship of the Telemedia network, and as such broadcast Toronto Blue Jays baseball games (with Tom Cheek and Jerry Howarth calling the action) followed by hours of talk after the game. The station has been flagship radio station of the Blue Jays for most of their history since their inception in 1977 (with exception of a hiatus when CHUM was the flagship from 1998 to 2002). As the 1980s progressed and the winning Blue Jays became more popular, the sports features became CJCL's profit centre. Encouraged by the newfound success of sports radio in the United States, in 1992, the year the Blue Jays won their first World Series, CJCL would drop non-sports programming altogether on September 4, and became The Fan 1430, the first all-sports station in Canada. The station's nickname may have been inspired by WFAN in New York City, the first sports radio station in the world that led to the creation of sports radio stations everywhere.

In 1994, Telemedia acquired CKYC from Rogers, and on February 6, 1995, at noon, the two stations switched frequencies, with "The Fan" moving to 590 AM (subsequently becoming The Fan 590) and CKYC moving to 1430 AM (where it operates today as multilingual station CHKT). Telemedia was acquired in 2002 by Standard Broadcasting, who resold CJCL to Rogers Media.

In January 2011, CJCL became known as Sportsnet Radio The Fan 590, the move coming as part of a co-branding initiative with its television counterpart Sportsnet, amid indications that rival TSN was preparing to launch a competing sports radio station, TSN Radio 1050. The station's on air identity was then changed to Sportsnet 590 The Fan in October 2011.

The station also supports sports news updates for all-news radio CFTR.

Live sports
CJCL is the flagship station for the following teams' radio broadcasts:

Toronto Blue Jays (MLB baseball)
Toronto Raptors (NBA basketball)♠
Toronto Maple Leafs (NHL hockey)♠

♠-In case of conflicts with other sports broadcasts, one of the games will air on another station in the Toronto area. As Rogers owns the Blue Jays outright but only shares ownership (through Maple Leaf Sports & Entertainment) of the Raptors and Maple Leafs, the Blue Jays games have first priority on CJCL. CHUM shares rights to the other two teams, including all games that are played at the same time as the Blue Jays. In contrast, because of an exclusive CFL-wide multimedia deal with TSN that ensures all Toronto Argonauts games air on CHUM, any Raptors or Maple Leaf games that conflict with the Argonauts will air on CJCL. The two stations split the broadcasts of games that do not conflict with each other.

Roughly 11 Buffalo Bisons games (as of 2018) air on evening dates between June and August that do not conflict with Blue Jays games. The Bisons are the Triple-A East affiliate of the Blue Jays, and broadcasts originate from Buffalo-based WWKB.

The Fan 590 also features live coverage of the following:
Buffalo Bills (NFL football)
NBA All-Star Game
Major League Baseball on ESPN Radio (Sunday nights, All-Star Game & postseason; when not conflicting with Blue Jays games & weekday afternoon sports talk radio programming)
Memorial Cup hockey (championship game)
NFL Football (Sunday afternoons)

Previous live sports events on CJCL included:
Toronto Argonauts (CFL football) (2000-2001, 2007–2010)
Toronto FC (MLS soccer)
Ice Hockey World Championships (Team Canada games)
IIHF World U20 Championship (Team Canada games)
Toronto Rock (NLL lacrosse) (2006)
OHL All-Star Classic (OHL hockey) (2007)
International Bowl (NCAA college football) (2007-2010)
Premier League (soccer) (Saturday mornings, 2007–2010)
Grey Cup (CFL football) (2007-2009)
Toronto Marlies (AHL hockey) (2008-2010)
2009 World Baseball Classic (All Canada national baseball team games and the final four)
Ice hockey at the 2010 Winter Olympics – Men's tournament (All Team Canada games, plus the quarter-final game determining Team Canada's semi-final opponent, both semi-finals, and both the bronze medal and gold medal games)
 Ice hockey at the 2010 Winter Olympics – Women's tournament (gold medal game)

Notable on-air staff

Current

 David Amber
 Kevin Barker
 Jeff Blair
 Joe Bowen (Maple Leafs)
 Stephen Brunt
 Hugh Burrill
 Sam Cosentino
 Richard Deitsch
 Rob Faulds
 Elliotte Friedman
 Paul Jones 
 Ian Leggatt
 Jeff Marek
 Scott Metcalfe
 Tim Micallef
 Sid Seixeiro
 Gord Stellick
 Anthony Stewart
 Dan Shulman (Blue Jays)
 Eric Smith
 Ben Wagner (Blue Jays)
 Mike Zigomanis

Former

 Sandy Annunziata
 Jack Armstrong
 Alan Ashby (Blue Jays)
 Bill Berg
 Howard Berger
 Dean Blundell
 Greg Brady
 Tom Cheek
 Don Cherry
 Ken Daniels
 John Derringer
 Dirk Hayhurst
 Mike Hogan
 Jerry Howarth (Blue Jays)
 Jim Hunt
 Rob Iarusci
 Mike Inglis
 Peter Irvine
 Spider Jones
 Jim Kelley
 Andrew Krystal
 Nick Kypreos
 Don Landry
 Jim Lang
 Jeff Lumby
 Pat Marsden
 Doug MacLean
 Bob McCown
 Daren Millard
 Jack Morris (Blue Jays)
 Steve Paikin
 Dan Pollard
 Elliott Price
 Paul Rimstead
 Jim Richards
 Mike Richards
 Greg Sansone
 Chris Schultz
 John Shannon
 James Sharman
 Joe Siddall (Blue Jays; moved to Sportsnet television coverage)
 Steve Simmons
 Chuck Swirsky
 Mike Toth
 John Wells
 Brian Williams
 Mike Wilner
 Damien Cox
 Ric Nattress
 Mark Osborne
 Elliott Price
 Bob Weeks

References

External links

 
 
 "FAN 590 an experiment gone right" (Toronto Star article)
 Fan 590 Toronto's YouTube channel
 

Jcl
Jcl
Jcl
Sport in Toronto
Radio stations established in 1951
1951 establishments in Ontario
Sportsnet